Ekpe Peter Unuajohwofia (born May 18, 1993) popularly known as Demgohearword is a Nigerian comedian. He is an activist, social media influencer and entrepreneur.

Biography

Early life and education 
Ekpe Peter Unuajohwofia was born in Ethiope East Orerokpe, Delta State, Nigeria where he grew up with his family. He is the thirteenth child in a family of sixteen children.

In 1997, he attended Petiwas Nursery and Primary School in PTI Effurun Delta state, pushing forward on his educational background, he moved to Our Lady of Mercy Secondary School Orerokpe and graduated from First Baptist Secondary school. Peter received his pre-degree from Delta State University and later attended Houdegbe North America University Benin, where he earned a BSc degree in Political science.

Career 
In 2017, Peter was the Head of Administration at Integrity Engineering and Contracting Company (IECC) in Oman.

Peter started his career as a social media influencer and online activists. He is the founder of demgohearwordfoundation.

Peter is known for his use of Warri English called Waffi for his comedy, activist, and social media influencer works.

Philanthropy 
In 2020, from April 12 to April 19, Peter and his foundation embarked on a seven day visit to different locations in the city of Warri to share palliatives.

References 

Living people
1993 births